WKWC (90.3 FM) is a radio station  broadcasting an Album Adult Alternative (or Triple A) format. Licensed to Owensboro, Kentucky, United States, the station serves the Owensboro area.  The station is currently owned by Kentucky Wesleyan College.

References

External links 

KWCo
Kentucky Wesleyan College